Mohammed Mahroufi (born 1947) is a Moroccan football midfielder who played for Morocco in the 1970 FIFA World Cup. He also played for Difaâ Hassani El Jadidi.

References

1947 births
Moroccan footballers
Moroccan expatriate footballers
Morocco international footballers
Association football midfielders
Difaâ Hassani El Jadidi players
Nîmes Olympique players
Botola players
Ligue 1 players
1970 FIFA World Cup players
1972 African Cup of Nations players
Living people
People from El Jadida
Expatriate footballers in France
Moroccan expatriate sportspeople in France